1st Krajina Corps (Serbian: 1. , 1. ) was one of the seven corps of the Army of Republika Srpska (VRS). Before implementation into the Army of Republika Srpska, the corps was known as 5th Corps of Yugoslav People's Army or Banja Luka Corps. It was because of this fact that it was successor of the infrastructure, organization and most of the equipment. The main task of the corps was to defend western parts of the Republika Srpska, today however these areas are mostly part of Banja Luka region. It was the most numbered corps of VRS with between 51,000 and 60,000 soldiers. During the War in Bosnia and Herzegovina 6,997 died, 27,176 wounded and 1,031 soldiers have been missing.

Organization 
The headquarters of the 1st Krajina Corps was in Banja Luka. After the establishment of the corps, corps remained in previous 5th Corps organization which was actual during 1992. Responsibility zone of the 1st Krajina Corps was determined by rivers Sava, Una, Ukrina, Ugar and mountains Majdanska and Vlašić.

War-time organization 
 Corps Command
 1st Armoured Brigade (1. .)
 2nd Armoured Brigade (2. .)
 16th Krajina Motorized Brigade (16. .)
 27th Derventa Motorized Brigade (27. .)
 31st Mountain Storm Brigade (31. .) (HQ in Manjača barracks)
 43rd Prijedor Motorized Brigade (43. .)
 30th Light Infantry Division (30. .) (disestablished during 1992)

Light infantry brigades 
 1st Banja Luka Light Infantry Brigade
 2nd Banja Luka Light Infantry Brigade
 3rd Banja Luka Light Infantry Brigade
 4th Banja Luka Light Infantry Brigade
 1st Čelinac Light Infantry Brigade
 1st Doboj Light Infantry Brigade
 11th Dubica Light Infantry Brigade
 1st Gradiška Light Infantry Brigade
 1st Kneževo Light Infantry Brigade
 1st Kotor Varoš Light Infantry Brigade
 5th Kozara Light Infantry Brigade
 2nd Krajina Light Infantry Brigade
 1st Krnjin Light Infantry Brigade
 1st Laktaši Light Infantry Brigade (later involved into 2nd Krajina Brigade)
 11th Mrkonjić Grad Light Infantry Brigade
 1st Novi Grad Light Infantry Brigade (November 1994 – end of 1995 as part of 2nd Krajina Corps)
 1st Osinja Light Infantry Brigade (from March 1, 1994, part of 27th Derventa Motorized Brigade)
 1st Ozren Light Infantry Brigade
 2nd Ozren Light Infantry Brigade
 3rd Ozren Light Infantry Brigade
 4th Ozren Light Infantry Brigade
 1st Podgrmeč Light Infantry Brigade (never formed)
 1st Prnjavor Light Infantry Brigade
 6th Sana Brigade
 1st Srbac Light Infantry Brigade
 19th Srbobran Light Infantry Brigade
 1st Šipovo Light Infantry Brigade
 1st Teslić Light Infantry Brigade
 2nd Teslić Light Infantry Brigade (moved into 1st Teslić Light Inf. Brigade)
 1st Trebava Light Infantry Brigade
 1st Trebiš Light Infantry Brigade
 1st Vučjak Light Infantry Brigade 
 22nd Light Infantry Brigade

Artillery units 
 1st Mixed Artillery Regiment (1. map.)
 9th Mixed Artillery Regiment (9. map.)
 1st Mixed Anti-Tank Artillery Regiment (1. .)
 1st Light Artillery Regiment of Air Defense (1. .)

Other and background units 
 1st Engineering Regiment
 9th Engineering Regiment
 1st Pontoon Battalion 
 1st Signal Battalion
 9th Signal Battalion
 1st Military Police Battalion
 9th Military Police Battalion
 1st Automobile Battalion
 1st Medicine Battalion
 Independent Muslim Unit "Meša Selimović" (became part of 27th Derventa Motorized Brigade)
 Polygon and Arrest Unit "Manjača"
 36th Independent Armour Battalion (part of 30th Light Infantry Division)
 30th Signal Battalion
 Storm Battalion "Wolves of Vučjak" (previously was part of 27th Derventa Motorized Brigade)
 Students Brigade

Tactical and Operative Groups 
 Tactical Group 1 (TG-1)
 Tactical Group 2 (TG-2)
 Tactical Group 3 (TG-3)
 Tactical Group 4 (TG-4)
 Tactical Group 5 (TG-5)
 Operative Group Vlašić (OG Vlašić)
 Operative Group Doboj or 9th Operative Group (OG-9, OG Doboj)
 Operative Group Prijedor
 Light Infantry Brigades Group Banja Luka

References 

Army of Republika Srpska